Burg Frauenstein may refer to:

Castles in Germany:
Burg Frauenstein (Bad Lauterberg),  Bad Lauterberg, Lower Saxony
Burgruine Frauenstein (Erzgebirge) in Frauenstein, Saxony
Burgstall Frauenstein Hohenschwangau in Bavaria 
Burg Frauenstein (Pfalz), Ruppertsecken in Rhineland-Palatinate
Burg Frauenstein (Winklarn),  Winklarn in Bavaria
Burg Frauenstein (Wiesbaden) in Wiesbaden-Frauenstein in Hesse
Castle in Austria:
Burg Frauenstein (Mining) near Braunau am Inn